Owch Bolagh (also Romanized as Owch Bolāgh and Ūchbolāgh) is a village in Gerdeh Rural District, in the Central District of Namin County, Ardabil Province, Iran. At the 2006 census, its population was 87, in 25 families.

References 

Towns and villages in Namin County